Johannes Antonius van der Laan (4 May 1896 - 24 August 1966) was a Dutch architect.

Life

Van der Laan was born in Leiden, the eldest son of the architect Leo van der Laan. He worked with his father from 1921 until Leo's death in 1942, mostly in Leiden and the surrounding area. After his father's death Jan had various partners in the architectural practice, which continued for many years to design significant buildings in the Netherlands. The partners were: Jan Hermans and Theo van der Eerden, and later Jules Kirch and Henk Blansjaar, who continued the practice until 1984. The practice was one of the largest in the Netherlands and specialised in work for Catholic clients in the style of the Delft School. He died at Leiden.

Jan van der Laan was a brother of Dom Hans van der Laan, also an architect, as was their youngest brother Nico.

Buildings 
Jan van der Laan's most notable buildings (before 1942 usually together with his father):
 St. Joseph's Old People's Home in Beverwijk
 Town hall, Eindhoven
 St. Catharine's Hospital in Eindhoven
 Church of Our Lady of Good Counsel, The Hague (1954)
 Mariastichting in Haarlem
 RK Industrie- en Huishoudschool Mons Aurea, Haarlem (1951-1960)
 St. Stanislas' Chapel in Delft (1955-1956)
 Great Convalescent Home in 's-Hertogenbosch
 St. Joseph's Church in Leiden (1924-1925)
 St. Leonard's Church in Leiden (1925)
 Vroom & Dreesmann in Leiden (1936)
 the town planning scheme for the University of Nijmegen
 the Radboud Hospital in Nijmegen
 C&A Amsterdam
 C&A Breda
 C&A Dordrecht
 C&A Gouda
 C&A Haarlem
 C&A Hoogeveen
 C&A Oosterhout
 C&A Roermond
 C&A Rotterdam

Bibliography
 David Geneste, Albert Gielen & Rick Wassenaar: L. van der Laan (1864-1942), J.A. van der Laan (1896-1966). Een katholieke architectenfamilie -rechtzinnig, maar veelzijdig en pragmatisch. Rotterdam, Stichting BONAS, 2002.

External links 
 Archive of Jan and Leo van der Laan at the Nederlands Architectuur Instituut 

1896 births
1966 deaths
Dutch architects
People from Leiden